The Chandigarh cricket team is a cricket team representing the Union Territory of Chandigarh in Indian domestic competitions. In August 2019, the Board of Control for Cricket in India (BCCI) named the team as one of the nine new sides that would compete in domestic tournaments for the 2019–20 season, including the Ranji Trophy. Former Indian cricketer, V. R. V. Singh, was named as the first coach of the team.

Chandigarh made their debut in the Ranji Trophy in December 2019, in the Plate Division. In their first match of the season, Arslan Khan scored the first century by a batsman for Chandigarh in first-class cricket. 

On 12 February 2020, their fixture against Manipur was the 60,000th first-class cricket match to be played.

Home ground

Sector 16 Stadium, Chandigarh

Current squad
 Players with international caps are listed in bold.

Updated as on 24 January 2023

References

External links
Facebook page

Cricket  in Chandigarh
Indian first-class cricket teams
1981 establishments in Chandigarh
Cricket clubs established in 1981